Kipsigis (or Kipsikii, Kipsikiis) is part of the Kenyan Kalenjin dialect cluster, It is spoken mainly in Kericho and Bomet counties in Kenya. The Kipsigis people are the most numerous tribe of the Kalenjin in Kenya, accounting for 60% of all Kalenjin speakers. Kipsigis is closely related to Nandi, Keiyo (Keyo, Elgeyo), South Tugen (Tuken), and Cherangany. 

The Kipsigis territory is bordered to the south and southeast by the Maasai. To the west, Gusii (a Bantu language) is spoken. To the north-east, other Kalenjin people are found, mainly the Nandi. East from the Kipsigis, in the Mau forests, live some Okiek speaking tribes.

The Kipsigis language has two lengths of vowel sounds. When spoken, a single vowel has a short sound of that vowel whereas the duplication of a vowel indicates an elongated sound of that vowel. Most common nouns in the Kipsigis language end with a consonant when a common noun ends with a vowel, it will either be an 'a' or an 'o'. Proper nouns like name of places and people can end in any vowel.

Double vowels 
Usually, the pronunciation of a double vowel does not mean a repetition of that vowel sound but rather an elongation of that particular vowel sound. An exception to that generalization shows up with the double 'ee'.

Normally, the elongated vowel sounds follow the Latin vowel sounds. A few examples are given in the table below

The sound of the double 'ee' may vary in pronunciation. For example:

Pronunciation of ng' and ng 
ng' has the sound of ng at the end of the English word Sing. 

ng, without the apostrophe, is pronounced as two separate syllables: n and g - as in the English word anger.

Aap 
The Kipsigis word '-aap' is an integral part of the Kipsigis language with an equivocated status and usage as the English conjunction 'of'. '-aap', usually used as a cervix of a word with an hyphen implicates the subject matter with a possessive relation.

See also

Notes
 See Kalenjin languages and Nandi–Markweta languages for a clarification of the Nandi/Kalenjin nomenclature.

References

Kalenjin languages
Languages of Kenya